Milena Bertolini (born 24 June 1966) is an Italian former footballer and current manager of the Italy women's national team. As the national team coach, she led Italy to qualify for the 2019 FIFA Women's World Cup following a twenty-year absence.

Playing career
Bertolini began her youth career with U.S. Correggese, before moving to Reggiana in 1984. The team won the Serie B title in the 1985–86 season, therefore earning promotion to Serie A. After spells at Modena Euromobil and Prato, she returned to Reggiana in 1990, helping the team to win the Serie A title. She later went on to play for Woman Sassari, A.S.D. Bologna, Aircargo Agliana and Fiammamonza. In 1996, she joined Modena Femminile, winning the league title in both her seasons at the club, along with the Supercoppa Italiana in 1997. In 1998, she joined Pisa S.C.F., before moving to Foroni Verona where she played until her retirement in 2001.

In 2018, she was the woman footballer inductee to the Italian Football Hall of Fame.

Managerial career
Following her retirement in 2001, she became an assistant coach at Foroni Verona, the club she last played at, with the team winning the 2001–02 Coppa Italia. The following season, she was promoted as the team's head coach, leading them to Supercoppa Italiana and Serie A titles. In 2004, she returned to her former club Reggiana, winning the 2009–10 Coppa Italia during her tenure. In 2012, she joined Brescia, where she won two Serie A titles (2013–14 and 2015–16), two Coppa Italia titles (2014–15 and 2015–16) and three Supercoppa Italiana titles (2014, 2015 and 2016). During her managerial career in Serie A, she won the Panchina d'Oro award as the best manager of the season on six occasions (2008, 2009, 2010, 2014, 2015 and 2016).

At the end of the 2010–11 season, Bertolini obtained a UEFA Pro Licence, allowing her to coach a high level men's team.

In August 2017, she was appointed as the head coach of the Italy women's national team. In 2019 Women's World Cup qualification, she helped the team to win their qualifying group with only one loss, thus qualifying for the 2019 FIFA Women's World Cup in France. The tournament is Italy's third appearance at the FIFA Women's World Cup, and their first qualification after a twenty-year absence.

Controversy
Bertolini was involved in a dispute in February 2022 by telling Nicolò Zaniolo to "reeducate" himself after he was sent-off for dissent. She later apologised for her vulgar speech.

Honours

Player
Reggiana
 Serie A: 1990–91
 Coppa Italia: 1988–89
 Serie B: 1985–86

Modena
 Serie A: 1996–97, 1997–98
 Supercoppa Italiana: 1997

Individual
 Italian Football Hall of Fame, woman footballer: 2018

Manager
Foroni Verona
 Serie A: 2002–03
 Supercoppa Italiana: 2002

Reggiana
 Coppa Italia: 2009–10

Brescia
 Serie A: 2013–14, 2015–16
 Coppa Italia: 2014–15, 2015–16
 Supercoppa Italiana: 2014, 2015, 2016

Individual
 Panchina d'Oro of Serie A Femminile: 2007–08, 2008–09, 2009–10, 2013–14, 2014–15, 2015–16

References

General references

External links

 
 

1966 births
Living people
People from Correggio, Emilia-Romagna
Footballers from Emilia-Romagna
Italian women's footballers
Italy women's international footballers
Women's association football defenders
A.S.D. Reggiana Calcio Femminile players
Torres Calcio Femminile players
ASD Fiammamonza 1970 players
Serie A (women's football) players
Italian football managers
Female association football managers
Italy women's national football team managers
2019 FIFA Women's World Cup managers
Sportspeople from the Province of Reggio Emilia
A.C.F. Prato players
C.F. Euromobil Modena players
UEFA Women's Euro 2022 managers